Balșa (or Balza) is a commune in Hunedoara County, Transylvania, Romania. It is composed of fourteen villages: Almașu Mic de Munte (Kisalmás), Ardeu (Erdőfalva), Balșa, Bunești (Bunesd), Galbina (Galbina), Mada (Máda), Oprișești, Poiana (Pojána), Poienița (Váleajepi), Roșia, Stăuini, Techereu (Tekerő), Vălișoara (until 1960 Porcurea; Porkura) and Voia (Voja).

References

Communes in Hunedoara County
Localities in Transylvania